Ro-117 was an Imperial Japanese Navy Ro-100-class submarine. Completed and commissioned in January 1944, she served in World War II and was sunk in June 1944 during her second war patrol.

Design and description
The Ro-100 class was a medium-sized, coastal submarine derived from the preceding Kaichū type. They displaced  surfaced and  submerged.

For surface running, the boats were powered by two  diesel engines, each driving one propeller shaft. When submerged each propeller was driven by a  electric motor. They could reach  on the surface and  underwater.

The boats were armed with four internal bow  torpedo tubes and carried a total of eight torpedoes. They were also armed with two single mounts for  Type 96 anti-aircraft guns or a single  L/40 AA gun.

Construction and commissioning

Ro-117 was laid down as Submarine No. 408 on 16 January 1943 by Kawasaki at Kobe, Japan. She was renamed Ro-117 on 5 July 1943 and was attached provisionally to the Yokosuka Naval District that day. She was launched on 13 September 1943, and was completed and commissioned on 31 January 1944.

Service history

Upon commissioning, Ro-117 was attached formally to the Yokosuka Naval District and was assigned to Submarine Squadron 11 for workups.

First war patrol

Ro-117 got underway from Japan on 31 March 1944 along with the submarine  for her first war patrol, ordered to intercept an Allied task force operating in the vicinity of the Palau Islands. She did not find the task force, and returned to Japan on 13 April 1944.

Second war patrol

On 4 May 1944, Ro-117 was reassigned to Submarine Division 51 in Submarine Squadron 7 in the 6th Fleet. She departed Kure, Japan, on 15 May 1944, called at Saipan in the Mariana Islands from 24 to 26 May 1944, then proceeded to Truk, which she reached on 31 May 1944.

Ro-117 got underway from Truk on 4 June 1944 for her second war patrol with orders to join a submarine patrol line north of New Ireland. On 13 June 1944 the Combined Fleet activated Operation A-Go for the defense of the Mariana Islands, and that day the commander-in-chief of the 6th Fleet, Vice Admiral Takeo Takagi, ordered all available submarines to deploy east of the Marianas. On 14 June 1944, Ro-117 received orders to proceed at flank speed to a new patrol area off the Marianas east of Guam.

The Battle of Saipan began with U.S. landings on Saipan on 15 June 1944. That day, the 6th Fleet ordered most of its submarines, including Ro-117, to withdraw from the Marianas. Ro-117 specifically was directed to patrol southeast of Tinian between the patrol areas of Ro-111 and Ro-113.

Loss

Ro-117 was ordered to return to Truk on 22 June 1944 but did not respond. On 12 July 1944, the Imperial Japanese Navy declared her to be presumed lost off Saipan with all 55 men on board. The Japanese struck her from the Navy list on 10 August 1944.

Notes

References
 

1943 ships
Ships built by Kawasaki Heavy Industries
World War II submarines of Japan
Japanese submarines lost during World War II
Ro-100-class submarines
Maritime incidents in June 1944
World War II shipwrecks in the Pacific Ocean
Submarines sunk by aircraft
Ships lost with all hands